Siogamaia is a small genus of very small sea snails, pyramidellid gastropod mollusks or micromollusks. This genus is currently placed in the subfamily Chrysallidinae of the family Odostomiidae. The genus was originally described as a subgenus of Tropaeas Dall & Bartsch, 1904, but was later erected to a full genus and placed within Chysallidinae by Schander et al. (1999).

Shell description
The original genus description (Nomusa 1936), states that Siogamaia is a shell of moderate size with many whorls. The outline is elongate-conical in outline. The surface is marked by weak axial ribs that are mostly shown in the earlier whorls. The interspaces between the ribs are smooth. The Aperture is obliquely ovate with a single distinct columellar fold. The outer lip is smooth within,

Life history
Nothing is known about the biology of the members of this genus. As is true of most members of the Pyramidellidae sensu lato, they are most likely to be ectoparasites.

Species
Species within the genus Siogamaia include:
 Siogamaia fortiplicata (Nomura, 1936) (Type species) (AsTropaeas (Siogamaia) fortiplicata)
 Siogamaia akasakiensis Nomura, 1936
 Siogamaia akatiperipherata Nomura, 1936
 Siogamaia asamusi Nomura, 1936
 Siogamaia desiderabilis Nomura, 1936
 Siogamaia kinkwazan Nomura, 1937
 Siogamaia morioria (Laws, 1941)
 Siogamaia minamotoi (Nomura, 1936)
 Siogamaia namensis (Corgan & Van Aartsen, 1998)
 Siogamaia odostomoides Nomura, 1937
 Siogamaia problematica (Nomura, 1936)
 Siogamaia quantoensis Nomura, 1937
 Siogamaia semiplicata (Turton, 1932)
 Siogamaia takonourana (Nomura, 1936)
 Siogamaia venus (Nomura, 1936)

References
 Ronald G. Noseworthy, Na-Rae Lim, and Kwang-Sik Choi, A Catalogue of the Mollusks of Jeju Island, South Korea; Korean Journal of Malacology, Vol. 23(1): 65-104, June 30, 2007

External links 
  Spencer H.G., Willan R.C., Marshall B.A. & Murray T.J. (2011) Checklist of the Recent Mollusca Recorded from the New Zealand Exclusive Economic Zone

Pyramidellidae

de:Pyramidelloidea